Lewis Bradley may refer to:
 Lewis R. Bradley (1805–1879), governor of Nevada
 Lewis Bradley (footballer) (born 2001), English footballer
 Lewis Bradley (rugby) (1889–1918), English rugby union and rugby league player